Buckley's Chance is a 2021 Australian/Canadian international co-production film about a 14-year old boy relocating with his mother to his grandfather's farm in Western Australia following his father's death, and who goes missing as a result of foul-play. The film is directed by Tim Brown who also co-wrote the film with Willem Wennekers.

The film's cast includes Milan Burch, Bill Nighy, Victoria Hill, Martin Sacks, Julia Billington, Ben Wood, Kelton Pell, and Anthony Gooley.

It was released to Australian cinemas on 24 June 2021, distributed by Transmission Films.

Summary
Two New Yorkers, 14-year-old Ridley (Burch) and his mother Gloria (Hill) travel to Australia to spend time with Gloria's estranged father-in-law Spencer (Nighy) on his remote Western Australian property "Buckley's Chance" (named after William Buckley), following the death of Gloria's firefighter husband in the United States.

Conflict arises between Ridley and his grandfather during Spencer's attempts at connecting with his grandson who always carries a camcorder, a gift from his late father. During a camping trip, Ridley storms off and comes across a wild dingo trapped in barbed wire fencing which he rescues.

Meanwhile, Spencer is being intimidated by three locals, Cooper, Mick and Oscar (Sacks, Wood and Gooley) in an attempt to get Spencer to sell "Buckley's Chance". One evening, Ridley stumbles on Mick and Oscar attempting to set fire to Spencer's hay shed and attempts to document this with his camera. Desperate to hide, Ridley jumps under the cover at the back of their ute but can't escape in time and ends up being transported to a location unknown to him. While escaping from Mick and Oscar, Ridley gets lost but is reunited with the dingo he rescued, who he befriends as he attempts to find his way back to "Buckley's Chance" in the harsh conditions of the Australian outback.

Upon discovering Ridley missing, Spencer and his station manager Jules (Pell) coordinate a search with the local emergency services.

Filming
Although the movie is set in Western Australia, it was actually filmed near Broken Hill, New South Wales in 2019.

Reception
Buckley's Chance received mixed reviews, as did Nighy's Australian accent, and the New York accents used by Hill and Burch.

References

External links 
 

2021 films
Australian drama films
2020s English-language films
Screen Australia films
Canadian drama films
Films produced by Gilbert Adler
2020s Canadian films
2020s Australian films